Federatsiya Tam Kui Khi-Kong (Russian ) is a Moscow-based martial arts organization founded in 2006, promoting  a Vietnamese martial art with the name  , which translates to "Three Refuges Qigong" (Qigong being the Chinese term for "cultivation of life-energy". Tam Qui School does not practice sparring fighting between students, because the spirit of the school and its ideology rule out competitiveness.

Publications 
Igor Mikhnevich, Кхи-Конг.  Древняя вьетнамская система физического и духовного развития личности ("Khi-Kong. An ancient Vietnamese system of personal physical and spiritual development"), 2006.
Thien Duyen (Igor Mikhnevich), Древнее вьетнамское боевое искусство (Ancient Vietnamese martial arts"), 2009. 160 стр. 
Thien Duyen (Igor Mikhnevich), Кулак Будды. Древнее вьетнамское боевое искусство Там Куи Кхи-конг ("Buddha's Fist. The ancient Vietnamese martial art Tam Qui Khi-kong"), 2010.

References
article in  "The magazine Buddhism of Russia" № 43/2010-11.

External links 
 Tam Qui Khi-Kong federation homepage

Vietnamese martial arts
Martial arts organizations
Sports clubs in Moscow